Beckfoot Thornton (Thornton Grammar School until 2016)  is a mixed secondary school and sixth form located in Thornton, West Yorkshire, England.

It is an Academy administered by Beckfoot Trust since 2016 and formerly a comprehensive foundation school administered by Bradford City Council and the Thornton Grammar and Queensbury School Learning Trust. It offers GCSEs and BTECs as programmes of study for pupils, while students in the sixth form have the option to study from a range of A-levels and further BTECs.

Notable former pupils
Amjad Bashir, politician
Eric Bedford, (1909–2001), architect
John Edward Fletcher, scholar
Robin Fox, anthropologist
Jack Kitching, rugby league player
Leon Pryce, rugby league player

References

External links
Beckfoot Thornton official website

Secondary schools in the City of Bradford
Academies in the City of Bradford